Shaemas O'Sheel (September 19, 1886 – April 2, 1954) was an Irish American poet and critic. Born James Shields, he changed his name to an anglicized spelling of its Irish version soon after high school. He worked briefly for the United States Senate (1913-1916), held jobs with various newspapers, and did publicity and advertising work. Although third-generation Irish American and never visiting Ireland, he was active in the Irish independence movement. He was, in his own words, "a very ardent communist and a staunch supporter of the Soviet Union".  However, because he disagreed with Soviet foreign policy, many communist publications (such as New Masses) refused to publish his work.

As a member of the League of American Writers, O'Sheel served on its Keep America Out of War Committee in January 1940 during the period of the Hitler-Stalin pact.

Publications
O'Sheel's published poetry collections include The Blossomy Bough (1912) and The Light Feet of Goats (1915). Louis Untermeyer characterized O'Sheel's poetry as possessing "mysticism and a muffled heroism". O'Sheel's work also appeared in the New York Times, the New York Times Book Review, Harper's, and other national publications.

References

Works

 
 
 
 
 
  (Introductory Essay by O'Sheel: "On With the Dance.")
 
 
  (Additional chapters prepared from Mr. Hale's notes by Shaemas O'Sheel.)
 

American people of Irish descent
1886 births
1954 deaths
Writers from New York City
American communists
20th-century American poets
American male poets
20th-century American male writers